Nautanwa is a Tehsil/Block in the Mahrajganj District of Uttar Pradesh. According to Census 2011 information the sub-district code of Nautanwa block is 00944. There are about 259 villages in Nautanwa block.

 Achal Garh
 Achalgarh
 Ahirauli
 Amahva
 Amava
 Araji Gayadatt Urf Subedarpur
 Araji Mahuva
 Araji Sarkar
 Araji Sarkar Urf Bairihawa
 Araji Sarkar Urf Jot Pharenda
 Araji Suvain
 Asuraina
 Aurahva Kala
 Aurahva Khurd
 Babhni
 Bagha 
 Bahorpur
 Baijnathpur Urf Charka
 Baikunthpur 
 Bairva Bankatva
 Bairva Bhatpurva
 Bairva Chandanpur
 Bairva Jungal
 Bakeniya Harraiya
 Banrasiya Kala
 Banrasiya Khurd
 Banvatari
 Barahara
 Barahra Bishwambharpur
 Barahra Shivnath
 Baranhava
 Barawa Bhoj
 Bargadava
 Bargadva Ayodhya
 Bargadva Bishunpur
 Bargadva Madhubani
 Bargadwa Urf Ganwaria
 Bariya
 Barva Kala
 Barwa Khurd
 Basantpur
 Bataediha
 Belahiy
 Belaspur
 Belauha Darra
 Belauha Ghat
 Belbhar
 Belva Buzurg
 Belva Khurd
 Bhagat Purva
 Bhagvanpur
 Bhairi Pipri
 Bhaisahiya
 Bharvaliy
 Bhotaha 
 Bhurkurva
 Bishkhop
 Bishunpur Kurthiya
 Bishunpur Phulvariya
 Bishunpura
 Bokava
 Brahmpur
 Chainpur
 Chakdah
 Chakrar
 Chamaini Urf Bhehri
 Chamainiya
 Chandi Than
 Chandpur
 Charlaha
 Chautarva 
 Chhapwa
 Chhitrapar 
 Dashrath Pur
 Deoghatti
 Devipur
 Devipur Kala
 Devpur
 Dhaurahra
 Dhotihva
 Dhuswakala
 Dogahara
 Durgapur
 Ekma
 Eksarva
 Farenda
 Gajaraha
 Gajpati
 Gajrahi
 Ganeshpur
 Gangapur
 Gangvaliya
 Gauharpur
 Ghorahava
 Gujroliya Shanker
 Hanuman Garhiya
 Harakhpura
 Hardi Dali
 Harlalgarh
 Harmandir Kala
 Harpur
 Harraiya Khurd
 Harraiya Raghubir
 Hathiya Garh
 Hathiyahwa
 Jagannath Pur
 Jamuhani
 Jamuhra Kala
 Jara
 Jhigati 
 Jigina 
 Jignihava 
 Jogiabari 
 Jugauli 
 Jungal Gulahariya
 Jungle Hathiyagarh 
 Jungle Sonval 
 Kaithvaliya Pathak 
 Kaithwalia Urf Bargadahi 
 Kajari
 Kandhpur
 Kandhpur Van Tangia 
 Karaila Ajgarha 
 Karailiya
 Karimdadpur 
 Karmahava Khurd 
Karmahva 
 Karmahva Basantpur 
 Kashipur
 Kataikot Urf Bhadrahana
 Kavlahi 
 Khairati 
 Khairhava Jungal 
 Khairhva Dube 
 Khalik Garh 
 Khanua 
 Kharag Barva
 Kodaipur Urf Gidaha
 Kohargaddi
 Koharwal 
 Koluha Urf Sihorva
 Kot Kamhariya 
 Kunserwa 
 Kurahava Bujurg
 Kurahava Khurd 
 Lalpur Kalyanpur
 Laxhmipur Kaithvaliya
 Laxmi Nagar 
 Luhasi 
 Luthhahva 
 Madrahava Kaktahi 
 Mahari 
 Mahdeiya
 Mahdeva Basdeela
 Mahdeva Kashiram
 Maheshpur Mahdiya 
 Mahuari 
 Mahuawa Adda 
 Mahuva 
 Mahuwa 
 Majhauli 
 Manglapur 
 Manik Talab
 Manikapur
 Marjadpur 
 Mathiyaidu
 Moglaha 
 Mohnapur 
 Murali 
 Murehra
 Murila 
 Naikot 
 Narayanpur
 Narkataha
 Nauniya 
 Navabi Ghat 
 Navadih Urf Deopur
 Nipaniya
 Paisiya Babu 
 Paisiya Lalaien
 Paisiya Urf Konghusari 
 Pakardiha
 Parauli 
 Pariya Tal 
 Parmesrapur 
 Parsa 
 Parsa Dayaram
 Parsa Malik 
 Parsa Pandey 
 Parsa Somali 
 Parsauni Kala
 Parsoni 
 Phulvariya 
 Piparhava 
 Pipra 
 Pipra Sohat
 Piprahiya 
 Pipriya
 Pokhar Bhinda 
 Pokharbhinda Urf Bangahva 
 Purainiya
 Purandrapur Sonbarsa 
 Purushottampur
 Raghunath Pur 
 Rajabari 
 Rajapur
 Rajdhani 
 Rajmandir Khurd 
 Rajpur Khurd 
 Ram Nagar 
 Ramgarhva 
 Ramnagar
 Rampur Jhalua
 Ranipur 
 Ratanpur 
 Rehra
 Rudauli Urf Karaila 
 Rudrapur Shivnath
 Rudrapur Urf Bangai 
 Sagarhava 
 Sakasi 
 Samardhira 
 Sampatiha 
 Sarangapur 
 Sekhuani 
 Semarhava 
 Semrahna 
 Semrahva Urf Jammu Haniya 
 Sevatari 
 Shishgarh 
 Shishvariya Urf Shismahal
 Shivpuri 
 Shyamkat 
 Sihabhar 
 Singhpur Kala 
 Sinhorva 
 Sinhpur Tharauli 
 Sirsiya Khas 
 Sirsiya Masharki
 Sisvaniya Bishun 
 Siswa Taufir
 Siswa Urf Khoriya 
 Sonbarsa Kahraiya
 Sondhi
 Sonpipri 
 Sonval 
 Sukrauli
 Sukrauli Urf Argha
 Sukrauli Urf Suryapura
 Sundi
 Surpar 
 Suryapura 
 Tal Ainjer
 Taraini 
 Tenduhi
 Terhi 
 Tharauli Buzurg
 Tinkonia 
 Trilokpur

Villages in Maharajganj district